Nyan Cat is a YouTube video uploaded in April 2011, which became an internet meme. The video merged a Japanese pop song with an animated cartoon cat with a Pop-Tart for a torso flying through space and leaving a rainbow trail behind. The video ranked at number five on the list of most viewed YouTube videos in 2011.

Origin

Animated GIF 

On April 2, 2011, the GIF animation of the cat was posted by 25-year-old Christopher Torres of Dallas, Texas, who uses the name "prguitarman", on his website LOL-Comics. Torres explained in an interview where the idea for the animation came from: "I was doing a donation drive for the Red Cross and in-between drawings in my Livestream video chat, two different people mentioned I should draw a 'Pop Tart' and a 'cat'." In response, he created a hybrid image of a Pop-Tart and a cat, which was developed a few days later into the animated GIF.
Nyan Cat was based on a real cat: Torres' pet cat Marty, who died in November 2012 from feline infectious peritonitis.

Song 
The original version of the song "Nyanyanyanyanyanyanya!" was uploaded by user "daniwell" to the Japanese video site Niconico on July 25, 2010. The song features the Vocaloid virtual singer Hatsune Miku. The Japanese word  is onomatopoeic, imitating the call of a cat (equivalent to English "meow"). The song was later included in the rhythm game Hatsune Miku: Project DIVA F, released by Sega in August 2012.

On January 30, 2011, a user named "Momomomo" uploaded a cover of "Nyanyanyanyanyanyanya!" featuring the UTAU voice Momone Momo. The voice source used to create the Momone Momo voice was a Japanese woman named Momoko Fujimoto.

YouTube video 

YouTube user "saraj00n" (whose real name is Sara June) combined the cat animation with the "Momomomo" version of the song "Nyanyanyanyanyanyanya!", and uploaded it to YouTube on April 5, 2011, three days after Torres had uploaded his animation, giving it the title "Nyan Cat". The video rapidly became a success after being featured on websites including G4 and CollegeHumor. Christopher Torres said: "Originally, its name was Pop Tart Cat, and I will continue to call it so, but the Internet has reached a decision to name it Nyan Cat, and I'm happy with that choice, too."

In March 2019, ownership of the YouTube channel hosting the original Nyan Cat video was transferred to Means TV, a worker-owned video streaming service.

Remastering and sale as an NFT
In February 2021, it was reported that the gif's original creator, Chris Torres, had created an updated version and sold it as a non-fungible token (NFT) for 300 ether, the equivalent of US$587,000 at the time of sale.

Reception 

The Nyan Cat music video reached ninth place in Business Insiders top ten viral videos of April 2011, with 7.2 million total views. The original YouTube video has received 199 million views . Nyan Cat won a Webby Award in 2012 for "Meme of the Year".

Due to the video's popularity, many new remixes and cover versions have been made, some several hours long. There are also ringtones, wallpapers and applications created for operating systems and devices, including a progress bar substitute for Windows which would show up in various places such as the file transfer progress indicator in Windows Explorer, following a request on the subreddit "Somebody Make This". Video games were developed for iPhone, iPad, Symbian, Android, Windows Phone, and HP webOS, and a variety of flash games such as "Snake" replicas using the cat's rainbow tail. "Nyan Cat Adventure", by 21st Street Games, is an officially licensed game. An officially licensed cryptocurrency entitled "Nyancoin" with the domain name nyanco.in (later nyan-coin.org) was launched in January 2014.

Website 

Christopher Torres initially criticized the website www.nyan.cat, which originally featured a similar-looking cat with the pop tart replaced by a slice of toast, and the same background music. The site, which uses the .cat sponsored top-level domain, was described by Torres as "plagiarized". Since 2012 the website has been operated by Torres, and shows the authentic version of the cat.

Temporary DMCA takedown 

On June 27, 2011, the original YouTube video was taken down from the site following a Digital Millennium Copyright Act complaint from someone claiming to be Torres. Torres immediately issued a statement on his website LOL-comics denying that he was the source of the complaint, and contacted Saraj00n and daniwell, who hold the copyright for the video and the song, in order to file a counter-complaint to YouTube. During the period that the video was unavailable for viewing, Torres received numerous abusive e-mails from people who wrongly believed that he had filed the DMCA complaint. On June 28, 2011, the Nyan Cat video was restored to YouTube.

Lawsuit 

In May 2013, Christopher Torres and Charles Schmidt, the creators of Nyan Cat and Keyboard Cat respectively, jointly sued 5th Cell and Warner Bros. for copyright infringement and trademark infringement over the appearance of these characters without permission in the Scribblenauts series of video games. Torres and Schmidt have registered copyrights on their characters and have pending trademark applications on the names. Torres released a statement saying that he had tried to obtain compensation from 5th Cell and Warner Bros. for commercial use of the character, but was "disrespected and snubbed" multiple times. The suit was settled in September 2013, with Torres and Schmidt being paid for the use of the characters.

See also 

 Robot Unicorn Attack
 Techno Kitten Adventure
 Cats and the Internet
 List of Internet phenomena

References

External links 
 
 Nyan Cat on LOL-Comics, the original GIF animation by prguitarman (Christopher Torres), April 2, 2011.
 

2011 YouTube videos
2011 works
Fictional cats
Fictional characters introduced in 2011
Internet memes introduced in 2011
IOS games
Viral videos
Webby Award winners
Xbox 360 games